The 12817 / 18 / 73 / 74 Jharkhand Swarna Jayanti Express is a Superfast Express train belonging to Indian Railways – South Eastern Railway zone that runs between  and  in India.

It operates as train number 12817 / 73 from Hatia to Anand Vihar Terminal and as train number 12818/ 74 in the reverse direction, serving the states of Jharkhand, Bihar, Uttar Pradesh and Delhi.

Coaches
The 12817 / 18 / 73 / 74 Jharkhand Swarna Jayanti Express has 1 AC 2 tier, 3 AC 3 tier, 13 Sleeper class, 4 General Unreserved & 2 SLR (Seating cum Luggage Rake) coaches. In addition, they carry a pantry car.

As is customary with most train services in India, coach composition may be amended at the discretion of Indian Railways depending on demand.

Service

Traction

References

External links
 Indian Railway
 IRFCA

Transport in Delhi
Transport in Ranchi
Swarna Jayanti Express trains
Rail transport in Bihar
Rail transport in Jharkhand
Rail transport in Uttar Pradesh
Rail transport in Delhi